Apenas o Fim is a 2008 Brazilian comedy-romance film directed by Matheus Souza, his directorial debut, and starring Gregório Duvivier, Érika Mader,  Nathalia Dill and Marcelo Adnet.

The film is the result of a project by students of the film school of PUC-Rio, and it was all filmed at the university, with the support of the Department of Social Communication.

Plot
A girl decides to run away from her ordinary life leaving her parents, friends and her boyfriend Antonio. But before leaving, she resolves to spend the last hour with him, having a long conversation while walking in college. They speak about their relationship remembering the past, imagining the future and discussing a number of fears and issues involving their generation.

Cast
 Gregório Duvivier
 Érika Mader
 Nathalia Dill
 Marcelo Adnet
 Álamo Facó

Awards and nominations
 Festival do Rio - 2008
 Honorable Mention - Jury 
 Best Fiction Feature Film - The public choice award
 32nd São Paulo International Film Festival - 2008
 Best Brazilian Fiction Feature Film - The public choice award

References

External links
 

2008 romantic comedy films
Brazilian romantic comedy films
2008 directorial debut films
2008 films
Pontifical Catholic University of Rio de Janeiro
2000s Portuguese-language films